The first USS Magnet (SP-563) was a United States Navy patrol vessel in commission from 1917 to 1919.

Magnet was built as a private motor yacht of the same name by the Electric Launch Company at Bayonne, New Jersey, in 1910.  On 11 June 1917, the U.S. Navy acquired her from her owner, H. F. Lippett, for use as a section patrol craft during World War I. She was commissioned as USS Magnet (SP-563) on 27 June 1917.

Magnet served on patrol duties for the rest of World War I. She was ordered sold on 1 October 1919 and was sold in 1920.

Notes

References

SP-563 Magnet at Department of the Navy Naval History and Heritage Command Online Library of Selected Images: U.S. Navy Ships -- Listed by Hull Number "SP" #s and "ID" #s -- World War I Era Patrol Vessels and other Acquired Ships and Craft numbered from SP-500 through SP-599
NavSource Online: Section Patrol Craft Photo Archive: Magnet (SP 563)

Patrol vessels of the United States Navy
World War I patrol vessels of the United States
Ships built in Bayonne, New Jersey
1910 ships
Individual yachts